Soren Edsberg (born Søren Edsberg, 1945) was a Danish-born American painter. His work has been highly praised by Alexandre Cirici Pellicer.

He was the son of Knud Edsberg who was also a painter.  First Knud and then Soren joined the Church of Jesus Christ of Latter-day Saints (LDS Church) in 1961.

Many of Edsberg's works are of farm animals.  He also made several abstract works, including ones in which he inscribed verses of scripture on the art work.  One of his more widely acclaimed works was entitled "The Course of Life".

Edsberg was married to Johnna, a convert to the LDS Church whom he met while she was studying at the Royal Academy of Music in Copenhagen.  They had seven children.

In 1987 Edsberg immigrated to the United States and became an adjunct professor at Brigham Young University.  He also was involved in producing videos for educational and medical purposes.  He also operated the Hope Gallery of art in Salt Lake City.  He also operated a branch of the gallery in Provo, Utah.

Edsberg died September 25th, 2021 of natural causes.

References 

askart entry
Terryl L. Givens. People of Paradox: A History of Mormon Culture. (Oxford: University Press, 2007) p. 338.
artnet listing
Jan Underwood Pinborough, "Soren Edsberg: The Gospel Sets the Course of His Life", Tambuli, September 1987, p. 36.
EU Art Museum bio
Edsberg biography
high beam collection of articles related to the Hope Gallery
BYU newsnet article on Hope Gallery in Provo
Doyle L. Green, "The Edsbergs: Father and Son", Ensign October 1975, p. 42
Obituary for Soren Edsberg

Further reading
 

1945 births
Brigham Young University faculty
Converts to Mormonism
Danish artists
Danish emigrants to the United States
Danish Latter Day Saints
Latter Day Saint artists
Living people
Artists from Provo, Utah